Below is a partial list of proto-languages that have been reconstructed, ordered by geographic location.

Africa
Proto-Afroasiatic
Proto-Semitic
Proto-Cushitic
Proto-Berber
Proto-Niger–Congo
Proto-Bantu

Europe, Near East, and Caucasus
Proto-Northwest Caucasian
Proto-Abazgi
Proto-Circassian
Proto-Kartvelian
Proto-Georgian-Zan
Proto-Basque
Proto-Indo-European
Proto-Anatolian
Proto-Albanian
Proto-Greek
Proto-Armenian
Proto-Indo-Iranian
Proto-Indo-Aryan
Proto-Iranian
Proto-Balto-Slavic
Proto-Baltic
Proto-Slavic
Proto-Celtic
Common Brittonic
Proto-Germanic
Proto-Norse
Proto-Italic
Proto-Romance

North Asia
Proto-Turkic
Proto-Mongolic
Proto-Tungusic
Proto-Koreanic
Proto-Japonic
Proto-Uralic

Proto-Finnic (Proto-Balto-Finnic)
Proto-Mordvinic
Proto-Permic
Proto-Samic
Proto-Mansi
Proto-Khanty
Proto-Samoyed
Proto-Chukotko-Kamchatkan
Proto-Indo-European
Proto-Tocharian
Proto-Ainu

South Asia
Proto-Dravidian
Proto-Indo-European
Proto-Indo-Iranian
Proto-Indo-Aryan

Pacific Rim
Proto-Pama–Nyungan
Proto-Arandic
Proto-Thura-Yura
Proto-Trans–New Guinea (list)
Proto-Austronesian (list)
Proto-Malayo-Polynesian
Proto-Philippine
Proto-Oceanic
Proto-Central Pacific language
Proto-Polynesian
Proto-Admiralty Islands
Proto-Temotu language
Proto-Micronesian language
Proto-Torres–Banks language
Proto-Kra–Dai
Proto-Kra (list)
Proto-Kam–Sui (list)
Proto-Tai (list)
Proto-Hlai (list)
Proto-Sino-Tibetan
Proto-Sinitic
Proto-Min
Proto-Tibeto-Burman (list)
Proto-Loloish
Proto-Karenic
Proto-Hmong–Mien (list)
Proto-Austroasiatic
Proto-Aslian (list)
Proto-Khmeric (list)
Proto-Palaungic (list)
Proto-Viet-Muong
Proto-Munda

Americas
Proto-Eskimo–Aleut
Proto-Eskimo
Proto-Algic
Proto-Algonquian
Proto-Iroquoian
Proto-Uto-Aztecan
Proto-Nahuan
Proto-Mayan
Proto-Mixe–Zoquean language
Proto-Totonacan language
Proto-Na-Dené
Proto-Athabaskan

Proto-Tupian

Proto-Siouan

Macrofamily reconstructions
These are hypothetical proto-languages that cannot be substantiated using the scientific methods of comparative linguistics.
Proto-Altaic

Proto-Eurasiatic
Proto-Ural-Altaic

Proto-Dené-Caucasian
Proto-Austric
Proto-Amerind
Proto-Human language

 
Historical linguistics
Proto-languages